Joseph Brown Heiskell (November 5, 1823 – March 7, 1913) was a prominent Tennessee politician who served in the Confederate States Congress during the American Civil War.

Biography
Heiskell was born in Knoxville, Tennessee, the son of newspaper publisher Frederick S. Heiskell (1786–1882) and Eliza (Brown) Heiskell. He served in the Tennessee State Senate during the 32nd General Assembly from 1857 to 1859, representing Hancock, Hawkins, and Jefferson counties as a member of the Whig Party.

Following the state's ordinance of secession and the outbreak of the Civil War, he represented Tennessee in the First Confederate Congress and the Second Confederate Congress from 1862 to 1864. After being captured by Union soldiers in 1864, Heiskell was incarcerated. He remained in prison until the end of the war.

Following his release, he established a practice in Memphis, Tennessee, and was active in local politics. He was Tennessee's attorney general from 1870 to 1878.

Heiskell died in Memphis on March 7, 1913. Interment was in the city's Elmwood Cemetery.

Heiskell was a nephew of William Heiskell, the post-Civil War Speaker of the Tennessee House of Representatives.

Notes

References

 Robert M. McBride and Dan M. Robinson, eds., Biographical Directory of the Tennessee General Assembly, Volume I, 1796–1861. (Nashville: Tennessee State Library and Archives and Tennessee Historical Commission, 1975).

External links
politicalgraveyard.com

1823 births
1913 deaths
Democratic Party Tennessee state senators
Tennessee Attorneys General
Members of the Confederate House of Representatives from Tennessee
19th-century American politicians
Tennessee lawyers
Politicians from Knoxville, Tennessee
19th-century American lawyers